The figure-eight knot or figure-of-eight knot is a type of stopper knot. It is very important in both sailing and rock climbing as a method of stopping ropes from running out of retaining devices. Like the overhand knot, which will jam under strain, often requiring the rope to be cut, the figure-eight will also jam, but is usually more easily undone than the overhand knot.

The stevedore knot is the figure-eight knot with two half twists added before the end is finally stuck.

Different types

Figure-eight loop 

The figure-eight loop is used like an overhand loop knot. This type of knot can be used in prusik climbing when used in conjunction with a climbing harness, a climbing rope, and locking carabiner designed for climbing, to ascend or descend with minimal equipment and effort.

Figure-eight bend 

The figure-eight bend knot is used to "splice" together two ropes, not necessarily of equal diameter. This knot is tied starting with a loose figure-eight knot on one rope (the larger-diameter one if unequal), and threading of the other rope's running end through the first figure eight, starting at the first figure-eight's running end and paralleling the path of the first rope through the figure eight until the second's ropes running end lies parallel against first's standing end. The result is two figure-eight knots, each partly inside the other and tightening its hold on the other when they are pulled in opposite directions. This can be a permanent or temporary splice. While it precludes the ropes' slipping relative to each other, it is a typical knot in having less strength than the straight ropes.

Offset figure-eight bend 

The offset figure-eight bend is a poor knot that has been implicated in the deaths of several rock climbers.

Stein knot 

The stein knot (also known as a stone knot) is a variation of the figure-eight knot. It is used to secure a rope that is already passed around a post or through a ring. It is quick and easy to tie and untie. It is a device rigging rather than a true knot. In canyoneering, it is used to isolate rope strands to allow one person to rappel while another is getting on the rappel, or allow rappellers the option of using a single or a double rope. It is also used in basketmaking.

Symbolic use
 In heraldry, this knot is known as Savoy knot.
 In the United States Navy, a figure-of-eight badge was formerly worn by enlisted men who had successfully completed the apprentice rating. 
 In The Scout Association in the United Kingdom, awards for gallantry and long service are represented by a cloth figure-of-eight knot emblem in various colours.

See also
 Figure-eight knot (mathematics)
 List of knots

References

Further reading

Climbing knots